The Nokia 2.3 is a Nokia-branded low-end smartphone launched in December 2019 running the Android operating system

Design 
The Nokia 2.3 is 183 g and 8.7 mm thin. It has a dewdrop notch and thin bezels with a chin at the bottom with the Nokia logo. It does not have a fingerprint sensor however it does have Nokia face unlock. The Nokia 2.3, like x.2 series of Nokia phones, has a dedicated Google Assistant button on the left of the phone which can be pressed to quickly activate the Google Assistant or held and released for the Google Assistant to start and stop listening. The phone can be bought in 3 colours, Cyan Green, Sand & Charcoal. It charges via a microUSB port on the bottom and it has a headphone jack located at the top.

Cameras 
It has two cameras on the back of the phone, a 13 MP main sensor and a 2 MP depth sensor. On the front there is a single 5MP sensor. Its rear cameras have a dedicated night mode to take better pictures in low-light conditions. It films at 1080p 30 fps and supports auto HDR when taking photos which can also manually be turned on and off.

Reception 
Android Police criticized the Nokia 2.3 for still using a microUSB port over USB C, however praised the extra camera on the back. They say "The 2.3 hones in on that streamlining, enlarges a couple of aspects, but mostly retains much of the kit from the last go around."

Trusted Reviews say the most impressive part of the 2.3 is its two-day battery life. They also say the phone being part of the Android One program is a stand-out feature.

References 

Mobile phones introduced in 2019
Mobile phones with multiple rear cameras
2.3